The Naiste Meistriliiga (English: Women's Champions League) is the highest league of women's association football in Estonia. It is run by the Estonian Football Association and was founded in 1994. The league currently consists of eight teams. The league champion qualifies for the UEFA Women's Champions League.

Current clubs
The following eight clubs will compete in the 2022 season.

Champions

By season
This section lists all champions since the league's inception and the previous Estonian league champions.

By team

Awards

Player of the Year

References

External links
 
Naiste Meistriliiga at UEFA
Naiste Meistriliiga at Soccerway.com

 
Sports leagues established in 1994
1994 establishments in Estonia